Hirak Rajar Deshe (English title: "Kingdom of Diamonds") is an Indian Bengali dystopian fantasy musical film and a sequel to the 1969 anti-war fantasy musical Goopy Gyne Bagha Byne (and the second installment of Goopy Gyne Bagha Byne series) directed by Satyajit Ray. In the film, the musicians Goopy and Bagha (who received magical powers in the first film) travel to the kingdom of the Diamond King, to find a sinister plot at work - subjects are being brainwashed by rewriting their thoughts with rhyming slogans.

Plot
The magically musical duo of Goopy Gyne and Bagha Byne make a comeback in this sequel, where they are invited to the court of the Hirak Raja (The Diamond King, Bangla: হীরক রাজা) for their musical skills. They are to perform at the kingdom's Anniversary Celebrations.

Goopy and Bagha are bored with their lives as crown princes of Shundi and Halla. They are looking for a change, an adventure while they are still young, which comes in the form of a chance to visit Hirak (Land of Diamonds), known for its huge diamond mines. They happily set out for Hirak in the dress of commoners, unaware of the machinations of the King of Hirak (Utpal Dutt), who is a tyrant. Diamonds and riches get pent up in his treasuries, while his subjects starve and suffer. Those who protest are taken care of in the 'Jantarmantar'(জন্তর মন্তর), a chamber for brainwashing devised by the scientist (Santosh Dutta), who the king mocks calling as "Gobeshok Gobochondro Gyanotirtho Gyanorotno Gyanambudhi Gyanochuramoni"(গবেষক গবোচন্দ্র জ্ঞানোতীর্থ জ্ঞানোরত্ন জ্ঞানোমবোধী জ্ঞানোচুরোমণি) His ministers are mere puppets. The only enemy, the king, has in his land is Udayan Pandit (Soumitra Chatterjee). He is a school teacher and, more than that, he is a believer of values. The king sees him as a threat to his kingdom's new generation and forcefully closes his school down and tries to burn down books, and he flees to hide in the mountains after attacking soldiers who were trying to burn books.

Meanwhile, Goopy and Bagha are on their way to Hirak. By coincidence, they meet Udayan hiding in a cave, who informs them of the king's true nature. The two impress Udayan with their magical powers, who makes plans to use them against the tyrant. Goopy and Bagha agree.
The duo then heads into Hirak, where they are welcomed with grandeur. They entertain the tyrant king, fooling him into believing that they think he is great. They request him to show them his impressive diamond mine, where Udayan, disguised as a miner, plant a note in Bagha's shoe while bowing to them. While the inauguration of the large statue of the king, they check the note which is meet him in the jungle at night. While signalling to the duo, Udayan's signal is also seen by the king, who sends soldiers to catch him. They rob the treasury of the king according to the plan of Udayan (which was guarded by a tiger) using their magical music, to get diamonds for bribing the guards.

The king has his tricks, too. He also captures Udayan's students and takes them to the Jantarmantar for brainwashing. But Goopy and Bagha have already reached there using their magical powers. They have also bribed the Gobeshok onto their side, with the guards. On reaching the laboratory, the king and his ministers are stunned magically by Goopy's singing and then pushed into the Brainwashing machine.
After the king is brainwashed, he turns to the good side, he then, along with the villagers, pulls down his own statue situated at the center of the village, and everything goes back to normal in the land of Hirak raja.

Crew
 Producer: Government of West Bengal
 Director: Satyajit Ray
 Editor: Dulal Datta
 Art Direction: Ashoke Bose
 Sound: Robin Sen Gupta, Durgadas Mitra

Cast

Awards

Songs
All the songs were composed and penned by Satyajit Ray. He prominently used Anup Ghoshal as a voice of Goopy. Most of the songs were sung by Anup Ghoshal except one ("Kotoi Rongo Dekhi Duniay") sung by Amar Pal.

The soundtrack won two National Film Awards. Satyajit Ray won the award for the Best Music Direction. Anup Ghoshal won the Best Male Playback Singer Award.

Background score

Sequels

Goopy Bagha Phire Elo

Sandip Ray, son of director Satyajit Ray directed another sequel named Goopy Bagha Phire Elo. The film was released twelve years after the release of Hirak Rajar Deshe.

Future
Sandip Ray wants to make another sequel to this series. He had received many requests to make the fourth Goopy - Bagha movie. Ray said to The Times of India about the plot of the fourth film: "Making a Goopy Bagha movie without Tapen and Rabi is unthinkable. The only way I can do a fourth is by taking the story forward and introducing Goopy and Bagha's sons". The idea to weave a story around the next generation came from a line from the introductory song "" — "aar ache polapan, ek khan ek khan... (we have one child each)".

See also
 Joychandi Pahar

References

External links 
 
 Satyajit Ray Film and Study Collection, UCSC
 satyajitray.org on this film

Films directed by Satyajit Ray
Bengali-language Indian films
1980s Indian superhero films
1980 films
Dystopian films
Indian children's films
Films with screenplays by Satyajit Ray
Best Bengali Feature Film National Film Award winners
Films set in Asia
Indian science fiction comedy films
1980s science fiction comedy films
Films about magic and magicians
Fiction about mining
1980s Bengali-language films
1980 comedy films
Indian superhero films
Indian science fiction films